Margaret Reid may refer to:

 Margaret Reid (minister) (1923–2018), New Zealand Presbyterian minister
 Margaret Reid (politician) (born 1935), Australian politician
 Margaret Reid (scientist), Australian physicist 
 Margaret G. Reid (1896–1991), Canadian economist
 Margaret Reid (intelligence officer), British Hero of the Holocaust

See also 
 Margaret Read (1892–1982), American architect
 Margaret Read (anthropologist) (1889–1991), British social anthropologist and academic
 Margaret Read (musician) (1905–1996), Scottish viola player